Skärholmen Centrum, also known and contracted as SKHLM, is a shopping center located in the Skärholmen borough of Stockholm in Sweden. It was inaugurated in 1968 by Prince Bertil, Duke of Halland and has been refurbished a number of times, most notably in 2008, when it was reopened by King Carl XVI Gustav. It's one of five malls owned by the Grosvenor Group in Sweden, and attracts approximately 14 million visitors annually, with an annual turnover of SEK 2 billion.

See also 
 List of shopping centres in Sweden

References

External links

 

Shopping centres in Sweden
Shopping malls established in 1968
1968 establishments in Sweden
Buildings and structures in Stockholm